The Charity Foundation for Special Diseases, as a public and NGO entity, started its activities in May 1995 with the support of H.E. Hashemi Rafsanjani and Dr. Fatemeh Rafsanjani and other philanthropists.
The following objectives were chosen by the foundation to be addressed:
 Creating national determination for addressing the issues facing patients of special diseases.
 Promoting awareness on preventive culture and educational programs.
 Cooperation with public scientific and executive organs as well as state and international bodies.
 Providing support and counseling to upgrade the use of available budgets and potentials for launching and expanding therapeutic centers
 Supporting exchanges of information and experience as well as expanding research, educational and treatment services for patients
Activities of the Foundation were established on the following three grounds for patients of special diseases (Dialysis- Thalassemia-Hemophilia) and patients with severe illnesses ( Cancer-MS.- Kidney Transpalnt-Diebetic-):
 Prevention
 Treatment
 Education

History and Establishment 
The idea behind establishing such an entity came about when President of the foundation met few kidney and thalassemia patients in 1991. Their inappropriate living and medical condition forced her to travel to provinces to collect first hand information and get herself more familiarized with patients.
Due to the following prevailing conditions for patients, she had to report the result of fact finding missions to her father and asked for his immediate intervention:
 High epidemic of such disease in the country
 Expensive treatment and lack of remedies
 Patients inability to carry on a constructive work
 Psychological pressure on patients families
 Lack of supportive associations
 Lack of attention in addressing the issue by Ministry of Health

Dr. F. Hashemi, after holding several meetings with medical experts and officials dealing with treatment topics and many others involved in this field, in 1994 she proposed the establishment of an NGO supporting patients of special diseases. At the inauguration ceremony for 200 apartments and dialysis center in Vavan city south of Tehran provided by H.E. Hashemi Rafsanjani, the President of the Republic, the proposal was agreed by the President. Due to the importance of the matter, few ministers such as minister of health and foreign affairs became member of the board of trustees and finally in May 1995 on the occasion of the World Thalassemia Day, CFFSD was officially registered.

The first step to be taken was to survey the status of the patients, to find out the causes for developing the illness and possible solutions to resolve the issue toward improvement of the quality of treatment and living standards of patients. Studying the preventive measures in the context of therapeutic, Educational, Control and decreasing the impact of such disease on related patients are still being conducted as of today.

During these years, the Foundation has expanded its coverage from patients with Dialysis, Thalassemia and Hemophilia to other patients with severe illnesses : Cancer, M.S., Kidney transplants, Diebetic and E.B. due to its epidemic and high cost of treatments. The Foundation has struggled to take effective measures in addressing difficulties facing such patients during its 18 years of activities. Along this path, CFFSD has donated more than 1700 dialysis machines, 3600 hospital beds with accessories, and 6500 medical items to over 1100 medical centers across the country. It has also provided over 200 billion rials to more than 320000 patients to cover their pharmaceutical and treatment costs. To encourage the kidney donors, the Foundation has provided over 10 million rials as gifts to over 21000 donors.

Established Medical Centers 
 Sudeh treatment center (1994)
 Specialized medical center (1999)
 Bam clinic (2005)
 Sharq specialized medical center (2006)
 Diabetic 1 specialized center (2008)
 Rafsanjan center (2013)

Centers under construction 
 Najaf medical and rehab. Center
 Karbala therapeutic center
 Borojerd
 Shahrood
 Sharq hospital
 center for research, training and prevention of cancer
 Kavosh rehab. Center
 Gohar’Baran center

Most important international activities 
 Member of ECOSOC, UN body
 Member of Thalassemi International Federation (TIF)
 Potential member of Kidney Federation (IKFK)
 Potential member of Blood Transfusion Society (ISBT)

Few Important activities 
 Gift payment of EESAAR for promotion of culture of transplant and in appreciation of kidney donors ( council of minister decree 1995)
 Free of charge treatment of thalassemi-Hemophili-Dialysis patients ( council of M. decree (1996)
 Prevention of thalassemic child birth ( c. of M. decree 1996)
 Establishment of committees in each province by local authorities to review and resolve problems facing patients of special disease ( c. of M. decree (1996)
 Establishing personal insurance coverage for such patients through relative state insurance organization (1996)
 Adoption of law nullifying the prohibition of use of brain-death body organs for transplants ( Parliament decree 1999)
 Free of charge cost of operation of liver transplants for such patients (2003)
 Establishment of Sport Federation for patients of special disease (2004)
 Establishing personal insurance coverage for cancer, M.S. and diabetic patients (Parliament decree 2006)
 Increasing the number of therapeutic centers which provide medical services to such patients across the country. With support from ministry of health, medical universities and righteous volunteers, CFFSD increased such centers from 127 to 980

Medical and health organisations based in Iran
Organizations established in 1995